Jakub Hottek (born 24 June 1983 in Prague) is a Czech football midfielder who played for MFK Havířov. His former club was MFK Zemplín Michalovce.

Hottek began his coaching career in 2019, when he was appointed as FK Frýdek-Místek U19 assistant manager. He was promoted to first team assistant manager in 2020.

He was appointed assistant manager of Stare Mesto in 2021.

References

External links

Jakub Hottek at Eurofotbal.cz 

1983 births
Living people
Czech footballers
Czech Republic youth international footballers
Czech Republic under-21 international footballers
Association football midfielders
Czech First League players
SK Slavia Prague players
FK Chmel Blšany players
FK Viktoria Žižkov players
Livingston F.C. players
Scottish Professional Football League players
FC Nitra players
Slovak Super Liga players
Ayia Napa FC players
Cypriot Second Division players
MFK Zemplín Michalovce players
2. Liga (Slovakia) players
MFK Karviná players
Expatriate footballers in Cyprus
Expatriate footballers in Slovakia
Expatriate footballers in Scotland
Czech expatriate sportspeople in Slovakia
Czech expatriate sportspeople in Cyprus
Czech expatriate sportspeople in Scotland
Footballers from Prague